Umbermali (formerly known as Oombermali, station code: OMB) is a railway station on the Central line of the Mumbai Suburban Railway network.

It comes under Shirol village of Shahapur taluka of Thane District in Maharashtra. Khardi is the previous stop and Kasara is the next stop.

Background
The people demanded it be converted into an official station, to give benefits to nearby villages around the station. It was declared as an official railway station on 15 February 2018.

References

Railway stations in Thane district
Mumbai Suburban Railway stations
Mumbai CR railway division
Kalyan-Igatpuri rail line